Hari Kewal (or Harikeval) Prasad Kushwaha was an Indian politician and Member of Parliament for four terms. He was a member of the 9th, 10th, 12th and the 14th Lok Sabhas of India. In all four terms, he represented the Salempur constituency of Uttar Pradesh and was a member of the Samajwadi Party political party before his death. and his son Ravindra Kushwaha is also currently Member of Parliament 2014 till now

Personal life
Prasad was born on 15 March 1940 to Ram Lochan Prasad in Mahathapar in Deoria district of Uttar Pradesh. His highest attained education is under matriculation and attended Junior High School in Sauhanag, Deoria. He married Ganesha Devi on 13 May 1955, with whom he had three sons and a daughter. Prasad died on 15 August 2012 at the age of 72.

Political career
Hari Kewal Prasad has been in active politics since the 1950s–1960s. During his political career, he has been attached with several political parties; Socialist Party, Janata Dal, Samata Party (now led by Uday Mandal) & Samajwadi Party. During the 1970s, he was also a member of the Uttar Pradesh Legislative Assembly.

He has also held several key positions in the political parties he has been associated with.

Posts held

See also

9th, 10th, 12th & 14th Lok Sabha
Lok Sabha
Politics of India
Parliament of India
Government of India
Samajwadi Party
Salempur (Lok Sabha constituency)
Uttar Pradesh Legislative Assembly

References 

India MPs 1989–1991
India MPs 1991–1996
India MPs 1998–1999
India MPs 2004–2009
1940 births
Samajwadi Party politicians
Lok Sabha members from Uttar Pradesh
Samata Party politicians
Janata Dal politicians
People from Deoria, Uttar Pradesh
People from Deoria district
2012 deaths
Uttar Pradesh MLAs 1974–1977
Uttar Pradesh MLAs 1977–1980
People from Ballia district